Exophthalmos (also called exophthalmus, exophthalmia, proptosis, or exorbitism) is a bulging of the eye anteriorly out of the orbit.  Exophthalmos can be either bilateral (as is often seen in Graves' disease) or unilateral (as is often seen in an orbital tumor). Complete or partial dislocation from the orbit is also possible from trauma or swelling of surrounding tissue resulting from trauma.

In the case of Graves' disease, the displacement of the eye results from abnormal connective tissue deposition in the orbit and extraocular muscles, which can be visualized by CT or MRI.

If left untreated, exophthalmos can cause the eyelids to fail to close during sleep, leading to corneal dryness and damage. Another possible complication is a form of redness or irritation called superior limbic keratoconjunctivitis, in which the area above the cornea becomes inflamed as a result of increased friction when blinking. The process that is causing the displacement of the eye may also compress the optic nerve or ophthalmic artery, and lead to blindness.

Causes
Inflammatory/Infection:
 Graves' ophthalmopathy due to Graves' disease, usually causes bilateral proptosis.
 Orbital cellulitis – often with unilateral proptosis, severe redness, and moderate to severe pain, sinusitis and an elevated white blood cell count.
 Dacryoadenitis
 Erdheim–Chester disease
 Mucormycosis
 Orbital pseudotumor – presents with acute, usually unilateral proptosis with severe pain.
 High-altitude cerebral edema
 Granulomatosis with polyangiitis

Neoplastic:
 Leukemias
 Meningioma, (of sphenoid wing)
 Nasopharyngeal angiofibroma
 Hand–Schüller–Christian disease
 Hemangioma, cavernous

Cystic:
 Dermoid cyst

Vascular:
 Carotid-cavernous fistula
 Aortic insufficiency: manifests as a pulsatile pseudoproptosis, described by British cardiothoracic surgeon Hutan Ashrafian in 2006

Others:
 Orbital fracture: apex, floor, medial wall, zygomatic
 Retrobulbar hemorrhage: trauma to the orbit can lead to bleeding behind the eye. The hemorrhage has nowhere to escape and the increased pressure pushes the eye out of the socket, leading to proptosis and can also cause blindness if not treated promptly.
 Cushing's syndrome (due to fat in the orbital cave)
 Some forms of craniosynostosis:
 Crouzon syndrome
 Pfeiffer syndrome
 Pansynostosis

Anatomy

Proptosis is the anterior displacement of the eye from the orbit.  Since the orbit is closed off posteriorly, medially and laterally, any enlargement of structures located within will cause the anterior displacement of the eye.  Swelling or enlargement of the lacrimal gland causes inferior medial and anterior dislocation of the eye.  This is because the lacrimal glands are located superiorly and laterally in the orbit.

Diagnosis

Measurement 
Measurement of the degree of exophthalmos is performed using an exophthalmometer.

Most sources define exophthalmos/proptosis as a protrusion of the globe greater than 18 mm.

The term exophthalmos is often used when describing proptosis associated with Graves' disease.

Animals

Exophthalmos is commonly found in dogs.  It is seen in brachycephalic (short-nosed) dog breeds because of the shallow orbit.  It can lead to keratitis secondary to exposure of the cornea.  Exophthalmos is commonly seen in the pug, Boston terrier, Pekingese, and shih tzu. It is a common result of head trauma and pressure exerted on the front of the neck too hard in dogs. In cats, eye proptosis is uncommon and is often accompanied by facial fractures.

About 40% of proptosed eyes retain vision after being replaced in the orbit, but in cats very few retain vision.   Replacement of the eye requires general anesthesia.  The eyelids are pulled outward, and the eye is gently pushed back into place.  The eyelids are sewn together in a procedure known as tarsorrhaphy for about five days to keep the eye in place.  Replaced eyes have a higher rate of keratoconjunctivitis sicca and keratitis and often require lifelong treatment.  If the damage is severe, the eye is removed in a relatively simple surgery known as enucleation of the eye.

The prognosis for a replaced eye is determined by the extent of damage to the cornea and sclera, the presence or absence of a pupillary light reflex, and the presence of ruptured rectus muscles.  The rectus muscles normally help hold the eye in place and direct eye movement.  Rupture of more than two rectus muscles usually requires the eye to be removed, because significant blood vessel and nerve damage also usually occurs.  Compared to brachycephalic breeds, dochilocephalic (long-nosed) breeds usually have more trauma to the eye and its surrounding structures, so the prognosis is worse.

See also
 Boston's sign
 Carotid-cavernous fistula
 Enophthalmos
 Von Graefe's sign

References

External links 

Dog diseases
Disorders of eyelid, lacrimal system and orbit